Jimmy Antonio Martínez Ruiz (born 26 January 1997) is a Chilean footballer that currently plays for Huachipato as a midfielder.

International career
Along with Chile U20, he won the L'Alcúdia Tournament in 2015.

References

External links

1997 births
Living people
People from Bío Bío Province
Chilean footballers
Chile under-20 international footballers
Chile international footballers
C.D. Huachipato footballers
Naval de Talcahuano footballers
Universidad de Chile footballers
Deportes La Serena footballers
Chilean Primera División players
Primera B de Chile players
Association football midfielders
Outfield association footballers who played in goal